Each nation brought their under-20 teams to compete in a group and knockout tournament. The top teams and the best second placed team advanced to the knockout stage of the competition. Congo won the tournament after a penalty shootout against the Ivorians.

Group stage

Group A

Group B

Group C

Knockout stage

Semi-finals

3rd Place

Final

See also
Football at the Jeux de la Francophonie

External links
Sports at Official 2009 website

Football
2009
2009 in African football
2009
2009–10 in Lebanese football
2009–10 in Moroccan football
2009–10 in French football
2009 in Canadian soccer
2009 in Cameroonian football
2009 in Ivorian football